Vornicu may refer to:

Valentin Vornicu (born 1983), Romanian poker player and mathematician
Vornicu River, river in Romania